Chakarayapet is a village in YSR Kadapa district of the Indian state of Andhra Pradesh. It is located in Chakarayapet mandal of Kadapa revenue division.

References 

Villages in Kadapa district